A processing aid is a substance used in the production of processed food, and which may end up in the finished product, but which is not, by law, required to be disclosed to the consumer as an ingredient.

Ethical concerns
NGOs, journalists, and food writers have raised concerns that the current laws on processing aids amount to a loophole that enables food producers to avoid transparency, and thereby to deceive consumers as to the contents of their food.

Jurisdictions

United Kingdom
Under the United Kingdom food labelling regulations, a "processing aid" is defined as follows:

United States
Under the law of the United States of America, a substance is legally a "processing aid" and can be excluded from ingredients labels if it meets any of the following criteria:

References

Food processing